Néstor Cardoso (born 17 November 1935) is an Argentine footballer. He played in seven matches for the Argentina national football team from 1960 to 1963. He was also part of Argentina's squad for the 1959 South American Championship that took place in Argentina.

References

External links
 

1935 births
Living people
Argentine footballers
Argentina international footballers
Place of birth missing (living people)
Association football defenders
Rosario Central footballers
Footballers from Rosario, Santa Fe